Johanna Hanink is Associate Professor of Classics at Brown University. She specialises in ancient Greek theater and performance and the cultural life and afterlife of ancient Athens. Hanink also serves as a contributor to Aeon Magazine, the Chronicle for Higher Education, and Eidolon.

Career
Hanink was born in 1982 in Ashford, Connecticut. Hanink received her BA in Classics at the University of Michigan, Ann Arbor in 2003 and a Gates Scholarship in 2006, followed by an MA in Latin at the University of California, Berkeley. She achieved her PhD in Classics in 2011 at Queens' College, Cambridge.

Hanink's work focuses on Greek drama, and particularly Greek tragedy. In addition, Hanink is interested in Classical reception studies and especially the role Greek and Roman antiquity plays in modern political movements. Her 2017 book, The Classical Debt, examines the symbolic debt of Western civilization to Greece in light of the Greek financial crisis. Hanink also writes on issues of gender in academia.

Selected publications
 The Classical Debt: Greek Antiquity in an Era of Austerity, Harvard University Press, 2017. .
 Lycurgan Athens and the Making of Classical Tragedy, Cambridge University Press, Cambridge Classical Studies series, 2014. .
 Creative Lives in Classical Antiquity: Poets, Artists and Biography, co-edited with Richard Fletcher, Cambridge University Press, Cambridge Classical Studies series, 2016. .

References

American classical scholars
Women classical scholars
Brown University faculty
Living people
Alumni of Queens' College, Cambridge
1982 births
 University of Michigan alumni